Kim Tae-ho (Hangul: 김태호), professionally known as Big Sancho (Hangul: 빅싼초), is a South Korean songwriter, composer and music producer. He is part of the producing team Yummy Tone.

Songwriting and composing credits 
Songwriting and composing credits adapted from MelOn artist page until December 2020.

References 

South Korean producers
South Korean male songwriters
Year of birth missing (living people)
Living people